Ceuthophilus brevipes, known generally as the boreal camel cricket or short-legged camel cricket, is a species of camel cricket in the family Rhaphidophoridae. It is found in North America.

References

brevipes
Articles created by Qbugbot
Insects described in 1863